This is a list of NCAA Division I ice hockey teams that have produced alumni who have played in the National Hockey League.

Current NCAA Division I teams
A list of career leaders for current NCAA Division I programs

As of July 1, 2022.

Source:

Former NCAA Division I teams
List includes both active and defunct programs that previously played at the Division I level or equivalent.

References

College ice hockey in the United States lists
NCAA Division I ice hockey
Lists of ice hockey players